Dos tipos con suerte is a 1960 Argentine musical comedy film directed by Miguel Morayta. It stars Miguel Aceves Mejía and Ana Casares. Production design for the film was by Emilio Rodríguez Mentasti.

Cast
Miguel Aceves Mejía 		
Ana Casares 	
Mabel Karr 		
Francisco Álvarez 		
Mario Amaya 	 		
Alberto Argibay 			
Nelly Beltrán

References

External links
 

1960 films
1960s Spanish-language films
Argentine black-and-white films
1960s Argentine films